Philip Francis Smith (August 23, 1932 – June 22, 2017) was the second Master Chief Petty Officer of the Coast Guard, serving as the enlisted advisor to the Commandant of the Coast Guard, from 1973 to 1977.

Smith became the Master Chief Petty Officer of the Coast Guard on August 1, 1973, succeeding Charles Calhoun. He enlisted in the Coast Guard on September 20, 1949, and after recruit training served aboard , homeported at Seattle, Washington. After attending yeoman school at the Coast Guard Training Center at Groton, Connecticut in 1950, he returned to Seattle to serve in the operations division, Thirteenth Coast Guard District. Following a tour of sea duty aboard USCGC Bering Strait homeported at Honolulu, Hawaii from September 1952 to May 1954, he returned again to Seattle to serve as yeoman in the personnel division of the Thirteenth District office.

Later tours of duty included the Marine Inspection Office, Guam, Coast Guard Air Station Port Angeles Washington, the personnel division at the Seventeenth Coast Guard District office, Juneau, Alaska, Coast Guard Air Station San Diego, California, and the personnel division of the Eleventh Coast Guard District office at Long Beach, California. From March 1968 to March 1969, he served aboard , homeported at Seattle. He then returned to the personnel division in the Thirteenth Coast Guard District. He was promoted to the rating of master chief yeoman on July 1, 1966. While serving his last tour of duty at Seattle, Smith was selected as the second Master Chief Petty Officer of the Coast Guard by the Commandant of the Coast Guard, Admiral Chester R. Bender. His service medals and awards include the Coast Guard Good Conduct Medal with silver star, National Defense Service Medal with bronze star, United Nations Service Medal, Korean Service Medal.

Master Chief Smith died on June 22, 2017, in Seattle, Washington.

References

1932 births
2017 deaths
People from Brooklyn
Master Chief Petty Officers of the Coast Guard
Military personnel from New York (state)